Cyfluthrin is a pyrethroid insecticide and common household pesticide.  It is a complex organic compound and the commercial product is sold as a mixture of isomers. Like most pyrethroids (MoA 3a), it is highly toxic to fish and invertebrates, but it is far less toxic to humans. It is generally supplied as a 10–25% liquid concentrate for commercial use and is diluted prior to spraying onto agricultural crops and outbuildings.

Safety
In rats, the s are 500, 800 (oral), and 600 (skin) mg/kg.

Excessive exposure can cause nausea, headache, muscle weakness, salivation, shortness of breath and seizures. In humans, it is deactivated by enzymatic hydrolysis to several carboxylic acid metabolites, whose urinary excretion half-lives are in a range of 5–7 hours. Worker exposure to the chemical can be monitored by measurement of the urinary metabolites, while severe overdosage may be confirmed by quantification of cyfluthrin in blood or plasma.

Health and safety risks are controlled by right to know laws that exist in most developed countries. Cyfluthrin is regulated in the US by the EPA.

See also
 Cyhalothrin
 Imiprothrin

References

Fluoroarenes
Organochlorides
(cyano-(3-phenoxyphenyl)methyl) 2,2,3-trimethylcyclopropane-1-carboxylates
Pyrethroids